Amphoricarpos elegans is a species of flowering plants in the family Asteraceae. It is found in Georgia.

References

Cynareae
Flora of Georgia (country)
Plants described in 1894